The Hurst-Euless-Bedford Independent School District operates 21 elementary schools, 5 junior high schools, 2 traditional high schools, 1 non-traditional high school, and 2 major sports fields. It serves the city of Bedford, Texas, most of the cities of Euless, Hurst, and small parts of Fort Worth, Arlington, Colleyville, and North Richland Hills.

High schools
High schools in the Hurst-Euless-Bedford ISD serve students in the 10th grade through the 12th grade.

Junior high schools
Junior high schools in the Hurst-Euless-Bedford ISD serve students in the 7th grade through the 9th grade.

Elementary schools
Most elementary schools in the Hurst-Euless-Bedford ISD serve students in pre-kindergarten through the 6th grade. However, where indicated by an asterisk (*), the school serves students in kindergarten through the 6th grade.

Other facilities

Notes

References

Hurst-Euless-Bedford Independent School District
Hurst-Euless-Bedford